Al-Jalaa Stadium (English: Liberation Stadium) is a multi-use stadium in Damascus, Syria, currently used mostly for football matches. It is also home to Syrian Premier League clubs Al-Wahda and Al-Majd. The stadium was able to hold up to 15,000 spectators. However, in 2020, the stadium was converted into an all-seater stadium with a capacity of 10,000 seats.

In 1976, the stadium was opened as part of the al-Jalaa Sports Complex, to host the 5th Pan Arab Games of 1976. 

In addition to the football stadium, the complex is also home to an indoor sports arena, outdoor Olympic swimming pool, several outdoor football training pitches and an athletes' hotel.

References

Football venues in Syria
Buildings and structures in Damascus